Arianna Del Giaccio (born 27 March 2002), known professionally as Ariete, is an Italian singer–songwriter.

Early life and career 
Del Giaccio was born in Anzio. At age eight, she started playing the guitar and after a few years, the piano. She then began writing and composing her first pieces. In 2019, she participated in the thirteenth season of the Italian talent show X Factor, qualifying for the first stages of selection, but being eliminated in the "Bootcamps". In August 2019, she released her first single, "Quel bar", followed by the single, "01/12," released in December of the same year.

After her first two independent releases, Del Giaccio was contacted by Italian producer Andrea Bomba, who invited her to open the musical event Rock in Roma. In 2020, she signed a recording contract with the label Bomba Dischi, with whom she released her debut EP, Spazio. It has been certified gold. On September 16, she released the single "Tatuaggi" in collaboration with the Italian music group Psicologi, a certified platinum. In November 2020, she released her second EP, 18 anni, also certified gold. In 2021, she featured in multiple songs by various artists, such as Alfa, Novelo, Tauro Boys, Bnkr44 and Rkomi, earning platinum with the latter for the song "Diecimilavoci". On 3 May, she released the single "L'ultima notte", also used in a commercial for Algida and certified double platinum.

On 25 February 2022, she released her first studio album, Specchio, containing eleven tracks, being later certified gold. The album debuted at number 4 on FIMI's album chart. In support of the release, she embarked on the Specchio Tour. In June 2022, she released her single "Tutto (con te)". On 4 December 2022, Ariete's participation in the Sanremo Music Festival 2023 with "Mare di guai" was announced.

Personal life 
Ariete is openly bisexual, and has expressed same-sex love as a theme in some of her songs, also doing activism on social platforms and during her concerts.

Discography

Studio albums

Compilation albums

Extended plays

Singles

As lead artist

As featured artist

Guest appearances

Filmography 
 X Factor (2019)
 Sanremo Music Festival 2023

Tours 
 Ariete in Tour (2021)''
 Specchio Tour (2022)

References 

Italian women singer-songwriters
People from Anzio
2002 births
Living people
Italian LGBT singers